This is a listing of the horses that finished in either first, second, or third place and the number of starters in the Suburban Handicap, an American Grade 2 race for three-year-olds at 1-1/8 miles on synthetic surface held at Belmont Park in Elmont, New York.  (List 1973–present)

References 

 June 17, 1904 New York Times article on the history of the Suburban Handicap

Belmont Park